The 2015 season will be Albirex Niigata FC (Singapore)'s 12th season in the S.League.

Sponsors

 Main Sponsor: Canon
 Uniform Sponsors for S.League: Yoppy, TDK-Lambda, RAIZZIN, Langrich
 Club Sponsors: COMM Pte Ltd, Mitsubishi Corporation, Kikkoman, Paris Miki, RGF Singapore, Daiho, WINN, SOODE, Kirin, CLEO, Nihon Assist Singapore, Sanpoutei Ramen, aguchi, ProtecA
 Apparel Sponsor: Mafro Sports
 Club Albirex: JTB, TAWARAYA, Shogakukan Asia, Konohana Kindergarten, Niigata Kenjinkai Singapore, Keihin Multi-Trans (S) Pte Ltd, IKYU, Hitachi, Taiyou Kouhatsuden Mura, IPPIN, CROWNLINE Singapore, Samurice, Porterhouse, NIKKEI, Zipan Resort Travel

S.League

Singapore Cup

Singapore League Cup

Squad statistics

Transfers

In

Out

Team Staff
Team Manager:  Yeo Junxian
Coach:  Tomoaki Sasaki
Trainer:  Kohei Tanaka

References

Albirex Niigata Singapore FC seasons
Singaporean football clubs 2015 season